Carmen Frei Ruiz–Tagle (born June 22, 1938) is a Chilean politician and teacher. She served as Senator from 1990 to 2006.

Frei was born in Santiago, the eldest child to Eduardo Frei Montalva and María Ruiz-Tagle. She studied at the Colegio Universitario Inglés; and later graduated as a teacher (specializing in infants) from the Universidad de Chile. She became a councilwoman for Santiago in 1970, and was elected Senator for Antofagasta in 1990, being reelected in 1998. She lost the position in 2006. She was married to Eugenio Ortega and has 3 children.

See also
Frei family
History of Chile

References

External links
Genealogical chart of Family Frei-Montalva

1938 births
Living people
People from Santiago
Members of the Senate of Chile
Chilean people of Swiss descent
Carmen Frei
Christian Democratic Party (Chile) politicians
Women members of the Senate of Chile
Children of presidents of Chile